Reds may refer to:

General
 Red (political adjective), supporters of Communism or socialism
 Reds (January Uprising), a faction of the Polish insurrectionists during the January Uprising in 1863
 USSR (or, to a lesser extent, China) during the Cold War by many US newspapers
 Reds (film), a 1981 American film starring and directed by Warren Beatty
 Secobarbital, a barbiturate derivative drug
 Red Arrows or The Reds, the Royal Air Force's aerobatics display team
 Reds Bassman (1913–2010), American football player

Sports teams

Officially known as the Reds
 Cincinnati Reds, a Major League Baseball team
 Queensland Reds, a professional rugby union team based in Brisbane, Australia
 Salford Reds, now Salford Red Devils, a professional rugby league team based in Salford, England
 Sarasota Reds, a single-A baseball affiliate of the Cincinnati Reds
 WA Reds, a professional rugby league team based in Perth, Western Australia

Unofficially known as the Reds
 Aberdeen F.C.
 Adelaide United FC
 Barnsley F.C.
 Canada men's national soccer team (usually in French as "Les Rouges")
 Cliftonville F.C.
 CSKA Sofia
 Hannover 96
 Hyde United F.C.
 Liverpool F.C.
 Manchester United F.C. (usually as Red Devils)
 Nottingham Forest F.C.
 Persepolis F.C. (Sorkhpoushan)
 Shelbourne F.C.
 S.L. Benfica
 South Korea national football team
 Sport Club Internacional, known as The Red
 Standard Liège
 Toronto FC
 Urawa Red Diamonds, a football team based in Saitama, Japan
 Workington A.F.C.
Wydad AC

See also
Red (disambiguation)
RED-S, Relative Energy Deficiency in Sport
Redd's Apple Ale